Janet Louise Smith (born 1951) is the Margaret J. Hunter Collegiate Professor in the Life Sciences Institute, director of the Center for Structural Biology at the University of Michigan, professor of biological chemistry and biophysics at the University of Michigan, and research professor in the Life Sciences Institute. Additionally, she is the scientific director of The General Medical Sciences and Cancer Institutes’ structural biology facility at the Advanced Photon Source (GM/CA @ APS).

Biography 

Smith is native of Pennsylvania and studied chemistry as a National Merit Scholar at Indiana University of Pennsylvania (BS, 1973). She continued her study at the University of Wisconsin-Madison (Ph.D., 1978) in structure in biology under Dr. M. Sundaralingam supervision. she continued to do her postdoctoral work with Wayne Hendrickson at the Naval Research Laboratory as a National Research Council Research Fellow.

Research 

Smith's research group focus on the understanding of proteins to the molecular level through structural biology. The main experimental technique employed in her lab is X-ray crystallography used to elucidate protein structures. Some of her research findings solved Crystal structures. Janet's lab has also worked towards method development for rapid structure determination. Her lab contributed to the development of multiwavelength anomalous diffraction (MAD) used routinely for structure determination.

Her research group have revealed the molecular structure of a protein produced by the Zika virus that is thought to be involved in the virus's reproduction and its interaction with a host's immune system.

Award and Honors 

 Fellow of the American Association for the Advancement of Science (2007)
 National Institutes of Health MERIT award recipient (1998–2008)
 Mildred Cohn Award in Biological Chemistry (2022)

References

External links 

 Lab Website
 Solved Crystal Structures

1951 births
University of Michigan faculty
University of Wisconsin–Madison alumni
21st-century scientists
American women biochemists
Living people
Scientists from Pennsylvania
American crystallographers
Structural biologists